is a Japanese tarento and actress. She is a former member of the Japanese idol girl group AKB48. She was a member of AKB48's Team 4 and was in JKT48's Team T due to a member exchange program that happened between 15 September and 19 October 2018.

Biography

Pre-AKB48
Kawamoto was born in Betsukai, Hokkaido on 31 August 1998. She is a big fan of Haruka Shimazaki. Before Shimazaki, Kawamoto admired Atsuko Maeda. When Kawamoto applied for the AKB48 Group Draft Kaigi, she admired Mako Kojima.

AKB48 career
Kawamoto debuted on 22 September 2013 at the first AKB48 Group Draft Kaigi. During the Draft on 10 November, Kawamoto was picked to join AKB48's Team B. SKE48's Team S, SKE48's Team KII, SKE48's Team E and HKT48's Team H. Through lottery, it was decided that Kawamoto would join AKB48's Team B. She later admitted it was the team she wanted to join the most.

Kawamoto debuted in AKB48 Team B's stage on 7 March 2014, performing "Avocado Janeshi".

On 26 March 2015, it was announced that she would be transferred to AKB48's Team 4.

In September 2018, Kawamoto participated in a month-long member exchange program with JKT48, during which she transferred to JKT48 Team T and lived in Jakarta, while JKT48 member Stephanie Pricilla Indarto Putri and Pimrapat "Mobile" Phadungwatanachok of BNK48 became members of AKB48.

On 6 July 2020, during an episode of AKB48 / OUC48 YouTube program Project 48, Kawamoto announced her graduation from AKB48 by the end of August. Her graduation concert, "Saya Kawamoto's Graduation Performance ~2486 Days of Treasure~", was held at the AKB48 Theater on 30 August 2020. She officially graduated from the group on her 22nd birthday, 31 August 2020.

Post-AKB48
On 2 December 2020, Kawamoto announced her affiliation with the talent agency Incubation.

On 20 February 2021, she made her acting debut in the net drama Net Kaidan × Hyakumonogatari Season 6.

Discography

AKB48 singles

AKB48 albums
 Koko ga Rhodes da, Koko de Tobe!
 "Birth"
 "To Go de"

Others
 Miyuki Watanabe's solo single, "Yasashiku Suru yori Kiss o Shite"
 "Harukaze Pianissimo"

Appearances

Stage units
Team B Waiting Stage
 
Team B "Pajama Drive" Revival

TV variety
 AKBingo! (2013–2019)

External links
  
 Incubation official profile
 Saya Kawamoto on Twitter
 Saya Kawamoto on Instagram

References

1998 births
Living people
Japanese idols
Japanese women pop singers
Musicians from Hokkaido
AKB48 members
21st-century Japanese women singers
21st-century Japanese singers
21st-century Japanese actresses